Dimitris Moustakas (born 8 January 1968) is a Greek retired football striker.

He became a top 7-goalscorer in the Greek second tier once, in 1995–96 with Doxa Vyronas. He played on the first tier for Xanthi and Kavala. In the early 2000s he played for Chalkidona and Agrotikos Asteras.

References

1968 births
Living people
Serbian footballers
Xanthi F.C. players
Doxa Vyronas F.C. players
Kavala F.C. players
Chalkidona F.C. players
Agrotikos Asteras F.C. players
Association football forwards